A Love Song is a 2022 American drama film written, directed, produced, and co-edited by Max Walker-Silverman in his feature directorial debut. It stars Dale Dickey and Wes Studi as two childhood friends who spend a night together by a lake in the mountains. The film premiered at the Sundance Film Festival on January 20, 2022, and was released in the United States on July 29, 2022, by Bleecker Street and Stage 6 Films. It received generally positive reviews from critics.

Plot
A lonely widowed woman, Faye, waits at a campsite by a lake in the Colorado Mountains for Lito, her childhood friend whom she hasn't seen in years, to visit her. As she does not know when he'll be arriving or what he currently looks like, she passes the time with birdwatching, stargazing, and encountering guests on other campsites. These include a polite group of siblings waiting for Faye to move so that they can dig up the coffin of their father so that they can rebury him at a different location, and an engaged lesbian couple who invite Faye to dinner, during which one of the women, Jan, nervously asks her if marriage is worth it. 

Lito eventually arrives, and he and Faye spend the day sharing memories, playing music together, and reminiscing about their deceased spouses. Lito takes a photo of Faye, which embarrasses her, as she would rather Lito remember her when as she was when she was young and attractive. At night, after bonding over their shared sense of grief and admittance that they miss their respective partners, the friends sleep together. In the morning, Lito goes to gather flowers for Faye, but becomes overwhelmed with emotion. When Faye goes outside to greet him, he awkwardly thanks her for the invitation, but confesses that he cannot start a romantic relationship with her. Faye is hurt, but understands, and helps him leave.

Faye hikes alone across the landscape and appreciates the view of the stars at night, gradually coming to terms with her turbulent emotions and disappointments. In the morning, she visits Jan and advises her to get married and enjoy her life. Afterwards, she departs the campsite, driving away as the siblings from earlier begin to dig up their father's coffin.

Cast
 Dale Dickey as Faye
 Wes Studi as Lito
 Michelle Wilson as Jan

Production
A Love Song was written, directed, and produced by Max Walker-Silverman in his feature debut. Noting the minimal dialogue, the filmmaker said he "gave these characters the gift of silence with the knowledge that these roles would be played by two masters."

Release
The film premiered at the Sundance Film Festival on January 20, 2022. It showed at the 72nd Berlin International Film Festival on February 12, 2022, and at the Tribeca Film Festival in June 2022.

In January 2022, Cinetic Media acquired the film's sales rights in the United States and Canada. The following month, Bleecker Street and Stage 6 Films acquired worldwide distribution rights to the film, planning a summer release for the film. It was released in theaters in the United States on July 29, 2022.

Reception

References

External links
 
 

2022 films
2022 drama films
Films set in Colorado
Films about friendship
Films about widowhood
2022 directorial debut films
American drama films
2022 independent films
Bleecker Street films
2020s English-language films
2020s American films